The High as Hope Tour was the fourth concert tour by British indie band Florence and the Machine, in support of their fourth studio album, High as Hope (2018). The tour began on 5 August 2018 in Montreal, Canada and concluded on 22 September 2019 in Athens, Greece.

Set list

This set list is representative of the 22 November 2018 show in London. It does not represent all dates of the tour.

"June"
"Hunger"
"Between Two Lungs"
"Only If for a Night"
"Queen of Peace"
"South London Forever"
"Patricia"
"Dog Days Are Over"
"Ship to Wreck"
"The End of Love"
"Cosmic Love"
"Delilah"
"What Kind of Man"
"Grace"

Encore
  "Big God"
"Shake It Out"

Shows

Cancelled shows

Notes

References

2018 concert tours
2019 concert tours
Florence and the Machine concert tours